The 2009–2011 Catalan independence referendums, a series of non-binding and unofficial referendums, "popular votes" (consultes populars), took place in municipalities around Catalonia. In them voters indicated whether they supported Catalan independence from Spain. The first such referendum took place in Arenys de Munt on 13 September 2009: there followed votes in Sant Jaume de Frontanyà on 12 December and in 166 other municipalities on 13 December. Another vote ensued in April 2011 in Barcelona.

Provisional figures for the 13 December vote suggest a turnout of around 200,000 (30% of those eligible to vote).

Context
The referendum in Arenys de Munt was called by the municipality following a motion in the town council by councillors from the Popular Unity Candidates (CUP). It came a time of growing frustration in "catalanist" circles at the delays in implementing the Statute of Autonomy of 2006. In particular, more than one-third of the provisions of the Statute had been appealed to the Constitutional Court of Spain by the People's Party, the largest opposition party in the Cortes Generales (Spanish parliament). More than three years later, the Constitutional Court had still not decided the case, with the ten judges in an unprecedented and increasingly politicised deadlock.

The relative success of the vote in Arenys de Munt, with a turnout of 41% and despite the efforts of the Spanish government to prevent the referendum, led to similar movements appearing in other Catalan municipalities. Given the difficulties of organising a vote without official support, the consultations were not all programmed for the same day: it had been hoped to organise votes in October 2009, but the date of 13 December was chosen for the next round of voting in 167 municipalities (Sant Jaume de Frontanyà, the smallest municipality in Catalonia with just 21 voters, decided to advance the poll by one day).

Legal Background in Spanish Constitutional Law
The Spanish Constitution of 1978 allows for consultative referendums on "political decisions of special importance" (Art. 92): however, the holding of such a referendum requires the approval of both the government and the Congress of Deputies (the lower house of the Cortes Generales).

Art. 2 of the 1978 Constitution also refers to "the indissoluble unity of the Spanish Nation, the common and indivisible homeland of all Spaniards," which would appear to imply that the de jure independence of any of the autonomous communities would have to come about, in the first instance, through a constitutional amendment to Article 2 itself.

Such an amendment process would, if undertaken, take place under the onerous provisions of Art. 168, requiring:
Firstly a two-thirds majority of both chambers of the Cortes Generales;
Secondly the dissolution of the Cortes Generales followed by a general election;
Thirdly a reapproval of the amendment by a two-thirds majority in both chambers of this newly elected Cortes Generales; and
Fourthly by subsequent ratification in a national referendum held in all of Spain.

Phases

The consultations on the independence of the Catalan nation took place in several stages:

 September 13, 2009: First referendum, in Arenys de Munt.
 12 and December 13, 2009: Referendums held in 167 municipalities. This phase was done in two days:
 December 12, 2009: Referendum in Sant Jaume de Frontanyà.
 December 13, 2009: Referendums held in 166 municipalities.
 February 28, 2010: Third stage of consultations in 80 municipalities.
 24 and April 25, 2010: Fourth stage of consultations in 211 municipalities.
 April 24, 2010: Referendum in Esparraguera.
 April 25, 2010: Referendums held in 210 municipalities, including the cities of Girona and Lleida.
 May 30, 2010: Referendum in  Sabadell.
 June 20, 2010: Fifth stage of referendums.
 April 10, 2011: Referendum in Barcelona.

Beginning

A local referendum, in the town of Arenys de Munt, was the first vote ever held on the question of Catalan independence, and led to a series of parallel non-binding referendums on the independence question in late 2009 and early 2010. The process began on 4 June 2009, when the municipal council in Arenys de Munt voted in favour of a motion presented by Popular Unity Candidates (CUP), calling for a non-binding referendum on independence for Catalonia. The council sought to make locations available at which voters could cast ballots, and to facilitate the organization of the vote, but a court ruling overruled the Council's decision and the Council had to abandon its efforts to facilitate the referendum. The referendum organizing committee then rented the "Centre Moral" (a sort of social club, a private entity) of the village in order to be able to conduct the vote. The Council continued to support to the initiative in principle, even though it complied with the court ruling. The mayor of Arenys de Munt, Carles Móra, was particularly vocal in his support.

Referendum of September 13 (Arenys de Munt) 

Residents of the town of Arenys de Munt were asked the following question: Està d'acord que Catalunya esdevingui un Estat de dret, independent, democràtic i social, integrat a la Unió Europea? (Do you agree on Catalonia becoming an independent, democratic and social constitutional state, integrated in the European Union?). Despite the unofficial nature of the referendum, the relatively high participation rate (41%), which was higher than the one reached in the last European election and in the Spanish constitutional referendum of 1978, gave credibility to the exercise. The "Yes" side won a commanding 96.2% of valid votes, while the "No" obtained 2.3%.

Reactions to the Arenys de Munt referendum 
The Arenys de Munt referendum has been a historical precedent and many political parties, organizations and platforms showed their agreement.

 Political parties like Republican Left of Catalonia, Popular Unity Candidates (CUP) and some prominent politicians of Convergence and Union and Initiative for Catalonia Greens gave full support to the query.
 Meanwhile, groups like the People's Party (PP), Ciutadans, Democratic Union of Catalonia (UDC) and a large sector of the Socialists' Party of Catalonia (PSC) showed clear disagreement with the query.
 Some members of the PSC and UDC played down the query.

The same night of the query, there were councils all over Catalonia who were interested to follow the lead of Arenys de Munt such as Argentona or Seròs.

In general, the initiative was criticized by the Spanish government, both Spanish Socialist Workers' Party (PSOE) and PP, and following the vote was open conflict between the two parties, as the PP accused the PSOE of having allowed an illegal query.

Internationally, the echo was also quite important: three hundred journalists were accredited to monitor the day, and several television stations were in Arenys de Munt to monitor the event.

Referendums following the vote in Arenys de Munt 
During the same night of the Arenys de Munt query, many municipalities in Catalonia showed up in favor of queries like the one that had organized the town of the Maresme. The following days, several consistories began to approve motions of support for queries on the independence promoted by entities of neighbors of the towns. Many separatist organizations supported the queries, until the Coordinator for the Consultation on Independence appeared, which will organize altogether. Thus began to emerge queries in the whole Catalan range that will be held in phases.

Query of 13-D

Course of the day

On 12 December, a day before the rest, Sant Jaume de Frontanyà, one of the less populous municipalities in Catalonia with only 21 voters, began the round of queries on independence.

Results

Press reactions

Austria
 The vote on the independence of Catalonia - Kleine Zeitung

France
 The Catalan nationalists organize a "referendum" - Le Monde
 "Le mal catalan" (Editorial) - Le Monde

Germany
 No legal value, but politically explosive - Tagesschau.de

Italy
 Catalonia, revolution by football - Il Giornale

Slovenia
Catalonia holds referendum on the regions's independence - Delo

United Kingdom
 Catalonia votes on independence from Spain
 Referendum fever spreads as Barcelona holds Catalan secession poll

Barcelona poll, April 2011
The April 10, 2011 poll in Barcelona had a 21% turnout with 9 out of 10 of those showing up to the unofficial poll favoring independence.

Institutional support 

The queries on the independence of Catalonia have been carried out by civil society and the implications of public institutions for their organizations are persecuted by the Spanish State. But several city councils and comarcal councils have approved motions in favor of this referendum to be called a civil organization, supporting them in this way without violating the laws.

Comarcal councils 

Five comarcal councils have spoken in favor and one against, covering a population of 630,000 and 10,000 respectively.

See also

Catalan separatism
Independence referendum

References

External links
 Catalan independence referendums, 2009–2011: context, organization and participation  by Jordi Muñoz, Marc Guinjoan i Ricard Vilaregut

Politics of Catalonia
Separatism in Spain
Independence referendums
2009 in Catalonia
2010 in Catalonia
2011 in Catalonia
Referendums in Catalonia
2009 referendums
2010 referendums
2011 referendums
Catalan independence movement